Leila Sheikh or Sheikh-Hashim is a Tanzanian journalist, women's rights activist and blogger. She was a founder member of Tanzania Media Women's Association (TAMWA) and became TAMWA's Executive Director in 1996.

Life
Leila Sheikh was one of the founder members of TAMWA in 1987, and later documented TAMWA's history. She was editor of TAMWA's magazine, Sauti ya Siti [Women's Voice]. In 1992 she oversaw a special issue on violence against women, with funding from the Swedish International Development Agency.

Sheikh was a TEDxDar speaker in November 2011. Though no longer Executive Director of TAMWA, she remains active as a women's rights activist in Dar es Salaam. She owns a consultancy firm, Studio Calabash Ltd, which designs lobbying strategies and public education programmes. She also works as a media producer and scriptwriter.

Works
 (with Anna Gabba) Ukatili dhidi ya wanawake mkoani Dar es Salaam : ushahidi katika wilaya tatu, Ilala, Temeke na Kinondoni [Violence against women in Dar es Salaam region: evidence from three districts, Ilala, Temeke and Kinondoni]. Dar es Salaam, Tanzania : Chama cha Waandishi wa Habari Wanawake Tanzania, 1990.
 A survey of sexual harassment in Dar es Salaam, [Dar-es-Salaam] : The Association, 1990.
 'Violence against Women is a Violation of Human Rights', Sauti ya Siti (November 1992), pp.3-10
 The rights of women in Islam. Dar es Salaam: Tanzania Media Women's Association, 1996.
 'TAMWA: Leila's Song – Supporting Women in Tanzania, in

References

External links
 
 Leila Sheikh at African Feminist Forum
 Leila's Cafe

Year of birth missing (living people)
Living people
Tanzanian journalists
Tanzanian women journalists
Tanzanian bloggers
Tanzanian women bloggers
Tanzanian feminists
Tanzanian activists
Tanzanian women activists